WTF with Marc Maron is a weekly podcast and radio show hosted by stand-up comedian Marc Maron. The show was launched in September 2009. The show is produced by Maron's former Air America co-worker Brendan McDonald.

Background
The show's title stems from the Internet slang abbreviation WTF (for "What the fuck?"). WTF launched in September 2009 following the cancellation of Maron's Air America terrestrial radio program Breakroom Live with Maron & Seder. Maron retained his Air America building keycard and, without permission, used their studios to record the first several episodes of WTF.

After the first episodes, Maron moved from New York to California. Most episodes of the show are generally recorded in Maron's home garage, nicknamed "the Cat Ranch", in Los Angeles. He ends most podcasts with the phrase "Boomer lives" in honour of a cat he brought from New York who went missing. The phrase became a hashtag and his production company name.

Occasionally shows are recorded in Maron's various hotel rooms (while on the road performing standup), the offices of his guests, or other locations. Every show opens with an audio sample of one of Maron's lines from the film Almost Famous: "Lock the gates!"

It began being distributed to radio by Public Radio Exchange in 2012.

Reception
WTF has received generally positive reviews, including positive writeups in The New York Times and Entertainment Weekly. On average, it receives over 220,000 downloads per episode—with the show purportedly reaching 100 million downloads by December 9, 2013. In 2014, Rolling Stone listed WTF #1 on their list of The 20 Best Comedy Podcasts Right Now. In 2022, the episode featuring Robin Williams from April 26, 2010, was selected by the Library of Congress for preservation in the United States National Recording Registry as being "culturally, historically, or aesthetically significant," becoming the first recording from the 2010s to be inducted.

Awards

Notable podcasts
 On an episode released in April 2010, Robin Williams discussed contemplating suicide. Maron later reposted the episode following the news of Williams' death, complete with new host segments talking about how much the episode shaped the show and his own personal life. In 2022, this episode was inducted into the National Recording Registry by the Library of Congress.
 Carlos Mencia  discussed his plagiarism allegations in a May 2010 episode. Maron thought that "something didn't feel right", and in the next episode he interviewed comics Willie Barcena and Steve Trevino, who offered accounts of Mencia stealing material. Maron then contacted Mencia, who immediately returned for a follow-up interview. Mencia admitted that during the initial interview, he "had an agenda", and then went on to discuss the allegations and his reputation in a much less guarded, more forthright manner.
 Louis C.K. gave a two-episode interview in October 2010, in which Maron and C.K. revealed that the two of them had a falling out, and discussed and rekindled their old friendship. During the podcast, C.K. became audibly emotional when talking about the birth of his first daughter. Slate called the interview the greatest podcast episode of all time in a 2014 list.
 Kevin Smith in a January 2011 episode detailed his acrimonious working relationship with Bruce Willis on set of his film Cop Out, which triggered a public feud between the two of them.
 During his January 2011 interview with Gallagher, Maron brought up the accusations of Gallagher's recent material being racist and homophobic. An argument ensued, resulting in Gallagher walking out mid-interview.
 Todd Hanson in a July 2011 episode gave a detailed account of his suicide attempt in a Brooklyn hotel room, and spoke about his lifelong struggle with depression.
 Todd Glass used his January 2012 appearance to come out as gay.
In 2013, Maron's assistant asked if he would be interested in interviewing "Kevin McDonald", to which Maron, a fan of The Kids In The Hall comedy troupe, agreed. On the day of the interview, Maron was greeted by a publicist who said that her client would be arriving to promote his movie. Maron was surprised, but thought little of it, as he rarely does much research or preparation before interviews. When the interviewee arrived, it was not Kids In The Hall comedian Kevin McDonald, but instead Scottish film director Kevin MacDonald, who Maron had never heard of. Since MacDonald had arrived early, Maron excused himself, then researched MacDonald and learned that he'd directed The Last King of Scotland, which he had seen, and Being Mick, which he had heard of. Maron used this knowledge as a starting point for the conversation, but the interview was shorter than a typical episode. Later, Maron bumped into Kevin McDonald while they were both performing in Los Angeles, and invited him to interview, so it could be a second segment of the same episode. McDonald noted that he had never met the director, but they were both represented by William Morris Agency and had been mixed up before (including once by the Internal Revenue Service). The episode was released with the title "Kevin MacDonald/Kevin McDonald" on March 10, 2014.
 U.S. President Barack Obama recorded an episode on June 2015 in Maron's garage. Recorded after the Charleston church shooting, the interview received attention due to Obama's use of the word "nigger" when discussing racism in America.
 Maron interviewed Saturday Night Live creator Lorne Michaels in October 2015. The interview was significant because throughout the history of the podcast, Maron would frequently discuss Michaels and his own rejection from being hired for SNL in the mid-1990s. The two-hour interview was posted in November 2015.
 Saturday Night Live cast member Pete Davidson appeared on the program in September 2017 and revealed his diagnosis and treatment for Borderline Personality Disorder.
 In February 2019, actress Mandy Moore said on the podcast that her marriage to musician Ryan Adams was "entirely unhealthy" and emotionally abusive.
In January 2020, former Red Hot Chili Peppers guitarist Josh Klinghoffer discussed the circumstances surrounding his exit from the band in his first public interview since leaving.
Peter Dinklage's appearance on the podcast in January 2022 attracted media attention for his criticisms of Disney's remake of Snow White, commenting on the "backwards" depiction of the Seven Dwarfs and accusing Disney of hypocrisy in using the film to promote progressive values.
 In a special episode, Maron released a September 2016 recording with Jerry Lewis that was planned as a full episode. As Lewis ended the show abruptly after about 20 minutes of conversation, he held off on releasing it until Lewis passed away a year later.

References

External links

Comedy and humor podcasts
Audio podcasts
2009 podcast debuts
Air America (radio network)
Interview podcasts
American podcasts